Philip John Densham (born 7 April 1957) is a former English cricketer.  Densham was a left-handed batsman who bowled right-arm medium.  He was born in Banbury, Oxfordshire.

Densham made his debut for Oxfordshire in the 1978 Minor Counties Championship against Berkshire.  Densham played Minor counties cricket for Oxfordshire from 1978 to 1988, which included 37 Minor Counties Championship matches and a single MCCA Knockout Trophy match.  He made his List A debut against Warwickshire in the 1980 Gillette Cup.  He played 2 further List A matches, against Glamorgan in 1981 and Warwickshire in 1983.  In his 3 List A matches, he scored 17 runs at a batting average of 8.50, with a high score of 10.

References

External links
Philip Densham at ESPNcricinfo
Philip Densham at CricketArchive

1957 births
Living people
Sportspeople from Banbury
English cricketers
Oxfordshire cricketers